Jai Malhar is Marathi mythological TV series being aired on Indian TV channel Zee Marathi. It is based on the legend of the Hindu god Khandoba, an avatar of Lord Shiva. The serial was re-ran in April 2020 due to the COVID-19 pandemic.

Plot
This series is based on Lord Martanda Bhairava aka Khandoba, a reincarnation of Lord Shiva. The show is about Khandoba's courage, magnanimity and prowess. He is also fondly known as Malhar and worshiped across Maharashtra & beyond as the family deity of many. His devotees express their devotion by chanting aloud "Yelkot Yelkot Jai Malhar". The foremost centre of Khandoba worship is Jejuri in Maharashtra & is thronged by lakhs every year who visit to worship the Lord. Khandoba has been portrayed as a God of love, a Superpower and the symbol of excellence. He is portrayed as a super hero for the young generation.

Cast
 Devdatta Nage as Lord Shiva, Lord Khandoba and Khandu Gavda (Lead).
Khandoba is an incarnation of Lord Shiva. He is the slayer of demons Mani and Malla. He protects his devotees from any obstacles. He predominantly resides in Jejuri. Besides, many other shrines are dedicated to him.

 Gauri Sukhtankar as Goddess Parvati Devi (parallel lead). Goddess Parvati is the consort of Lord Shiva and daughter of King Himavan. She is who gave promise to Jayadri to be Lord Shiva's wife as Banai. She is only Mhalsa as Lord Shiva said that due to her decision regarding Jayadri, as Mhalsa she will forget Jayadri. She often comes forth before Mhalsa and convinces Mhalsa about doing many things
 Bageshree Nimbalkar as Goddess Ganga Devi (parallel lead).
Ganga Devi is personification of river Ganga. She is sister of Goddess Parvati, elder to her. She also loves Lord Shiva. Parvati Devi doesn't like this. She is also related to Goddess Banai.

 Surabhi Hande as Goddess Mhalsa Devi (main Lead).
Goddess Mhalasa is from Nevasa. Daughter of Timmasheth Vani (merchant) and Mayananda. She married Lord Khandoba and came to Jejuri. She is wife of Lord Khandoba, a loving housewife who takes ferocious form to slay demons and is the queen of Jejuri. She is the incarnation of Goddess Parvati whose appearance is of Goddess Mohini, a form of Lord Vishnu.

 Isha Keskar as Goddess Banai Devi and Jayadri. (Lead) 
Goddess Banai also known as Banubai, is from Dhangarpada of Chandanpuri. Her biological parents are actually God Indra (king of deities) and Goddess Shachi, but she was raised by Ajamel, a Dhangar man. She is devoted to Lord Khandoba and is his wife. Jayadri is the daughter of Lord Indra and Goddess Shachi, who later reborn as Banai due to curse put upon her by Lord Indra.
 Prashant Choudappa as Sardar Choudappa (commander in chief of Lord Khandoba).
 Master Shanay Bhise as Lord Ganesha.
Lord Ganesh is the son of Lord Shiva and Goddess Parvati. He in Kailas was the witness of the promise given by Devi Parvati to Jayadri. He comes to Jejuri and often convinces Mhalsa Devi and Banai about many things and clears their various doubts about their original forms. He removes obstacles of path of many people. Mhalsa Devi, in this incarnation tooshares a loving motherly relationship with him. He often makes Mhalsa Devi forget her anger by amusing her. Mhalsa Devi Quickly becomes cheerful in his presence. He is cheerful, sometimes naughty but also caring and loving towards his devotees.

 Atul Abhyankar / Nakul Ghanekar as Hegadi Pradhan and Lord Vishnu.
Lord Vishnu served as Prime Minister in the form of Hegadi Pradhan for Lord Khandoba in the battle against the demons Mani and Malla. He is intelligent and aware of etiquette. He helps Lord Khandoba in making of plans and figuring them out.

 Purva Subhash as Goddess Lakshmi. 
Goddess Lakshmi is the wife of Lord Vishnu who supports Lord Khandoba and Lord Vishnu (as Hegadi Pradhan) in their tasks. She is the daughter of Samudra Dev, the sea God. She is a loving and caring woman and loves her husband, Lord Vishnu very much. She often convinces and advises Mhalsa Devi about many things.

 Anirudhha Joshi as Sage Narada. 
Narada is a Vedic sage who is the messenger of Gods and deities. He is a great devotee of Lord Vishnu and helps Lord Khandoba and Lord Vishnu in their tasks. He trains Banai to get wedded to Lord Khandoba. He sometimes unknowingly creates conflicts and also spices up some news.

 Swapnil Rajshekhar as Indra Dev.
Indra Dev is the king of gods and father of Banai. He only cursed jayadri and send her to Chandanpuri as a baby, where She was grown up as a Dhangar and named as Banai, he also tried to stop marriage of Lord Khandoba and Banai, but later he supports Banai as she is his daughter. He also had opened the secret to Banai that Hegadi Pradhan and Lakshmi Devi were actually Lord Vishnu and Goddess Lakshmi Devi.

 Akshay Milind Dandekar as Nandi. 
Nandi is known as Vahana (mount) of Lord Shiva. Since, Khandoba is a reincarnation on Lord Shiva Nandi is seen prominently in the story of Jai Malhar as Nandi, Nandeshrav and Nandeshwar. He usually is a link between Khandoba and Mhalasa and Banu. He is the eyewitness of every activity of Shiva and Paravati in Kailasa. He knows about the past life of Mhalasa Devi and Banai but he is not supposed to open up about it.

 Siddhesh Prabhakar as Lord Surya.
Lord Surya is the solar deity. Mhalsa Devi worships him and everyday offers him an Arghya and asks him many questions. Lord Khandoba's name is Martanda Bhairava, in which Martanda means Sun. So, Mhalsa Devi's Sun god worship can be traced here.

 Arti More as Latika.
Latika is the childhood friend of Goddess Mhalsa and helps Goddess Mhalsa in her tasks. She often hears confidential conversations and conveys it to Mhalsa Devi which creates conflicts.

 Priyanka Waman as Manji. 
Manji is a very close childhood friend of Goddess Banai. Goddess Banai shares her every problems with Manji in order to figure it out.

 Mahesh Phalke as Ranga. 
Ranga is a cowherd resident in Chandanpuri and a friend of Goddess Banai.
 Anjali Valsangkar as Shevanti.
Shevanti is the mother of Ranga.
 Sonam Mhasvekar as Gangi.
Gangi is the wife of Ranga, she often dominates Ranga.
 Prajakta Kelkar as Mayananda , Mhalsa's mother.
 Vicky Mokal as Ganya

Production
This series has gained popularity among the followers of Lord Khandoba. The costumes and jewellery used in this series have set a trend in fashion in some cities across Maharashtra. The title montage has been particularly popular. The effort taken by lead actors has been appreciated. It was happened first time on Zee & other Networks that serial version are in Non-Indian launguage and also dubbed in Thai aired Zee Nung as Jay Martand and popular Indian show in Thailand, Singapore & Malaysia.

Special episode

1 Hour
 18 May 2014
 3 October 2014
 22 March 2015
 25 April 2015
 19 July 2015
 27 September 2015
 29 November 2015
 27 March 2016
 17 July 2016
 6 September 2016
 25 September 2016

2 Hours
 17 August 2014 (Khandoba-Mhalsa's Marriage)
 3 May 2015 (Khandoba-Banai's Marriage)
 8 January 2017 (Malhari Avatar)
 30 April 2017 (Last Episode)

Reception 
The show received highest TVRs of 5.3 and 5.6 in week 47 and 52 of 2014. The series premiered on 18 May 2014 from Monday to Saturday at 7 pm by replacing Tu Tithe Me.

Ratings

Dubbed versions

Awards

See also 
• Khandoba Temple, Jejuri

References

External links 
 
 Jai Malhar at ZEE5 

2014 Indian television series debuts
Indian television series about Hindu deities
Marathi-language television shows
Zee Marathi original programming
2017 Indian television series endings